Naalvar is a 1953 Tamil-language drama film directed by V. Krishnan. The film stars A. P. Nagarajan, Kumari Thankam, N. N. Kannappa, M. N. Krishnan and T. P. Muthulakshmi in major roles. Nagarajan, who played the main lead was also the writer of the film. The film revolves around a family consisting of four siblings.

Plot
A. P. Nagarajan, a sincere cop is the eldest of four siblings in a family whose father works as a secretary to a mill owner. The second of the four siblings is a lawyer, third is employed in the same mill where their father works as a supervisor, (M. N. Krishnan) and the youngest of all is a social activist. Nagarajan happens to meet Kumari Thangam, not knowing the fact that she is the daughter of his father's boss, charges her for an offence. He is very sincere in his duty to such an extent that he even arrests his own brother when the latter commits a crime, and even takes the blame when his father's enemies try to make that his father was involved in smuggling of gold and printing of counterfeit currency notes, in order to protect his father and the image of the family.

Cast

 A. P. Nagarajan
 Kumari Thankam
 N. N. Kannappa
 S. R. Janaki
 T. P. Muthulakshmi
 M. N. Krishnan
 V. N. Natesan
 R. Balasubramaniam
 C. R. Vijayakumari
 V. M. Ezhumalai
 E. R. Sahadevan
 S. S. Majid
 Ratnakumari
 N. S. Narayana Pillai
 A. R. Damodaram
 T. K. Swaminathan
 V. R. Natarajan
 T. V. Satyamurthi
 Gauthamdas
 K. N. Kanakasabai
Dance
 Kumari Kamala
 Rita
 Sulochana

Production
Naalvar was shot at the Central Studios, Coimbatore and was produced by M. A. Venu under the banner Sangeetha Pictures. V. Krishnan was the director and the script was provided by A. P. Nagarajan. Nagarajan later became a successful film-maker as he went on to direct many successful films such as Thillana Mohanambal, Thiruvilayadal, Kandan Karunai and Thirumal Perumai in Tamil cinema within a span of two decades. These films earned a cult status in Tamil Nadu. C. R. Vijayakumari, who later became a popular actress in her own right in Tamil films, played a small role in the film.

Soundtrack
The background and soundtrack was provided by K. V. Mahadevan. Lyrics were penned by A. Maruthakasi, Thanjai N. Ramaiah Dass and Ka. Mu. Sheriff. Nagarajan also lent his voice for a song in the film along with the composer. Playback singers are N. L. Ganasaraswathi, U. R. Chandra, A. G. Rathnamala, G. Ponnammal, M. L. Vasanthakumari, K. Rani and Thiruchi Loganathan.

The song "Mayile Maal Marugan" did not take place in the movie.

Release and reception
Naalvar was released on 5 November 1953. The film fared well at the box-office and Nagarajan came to be known as "Naalvar Nagarajan".

References

Further reading
 
 
 

1953 films
1950s Tamil-language films
Films scored by K. V. Mahadevan
Films with screenplays by A. P. Nagarajan
Indian drama films
1953 drama films